Hitman in the Hand of Buddha (Korean title: 인무가인) is a 1981 Korean and Hong Kong martial arts film directed and produced by Hwang Jang-lee in his directorial debut, who also starred in the lead role, and co-directed by Park Yun-kyo, who also wrote. This was the first and only Hwang Jang-lee's film to produce in his own film production company. Hwang Jang-lee as a hero role without the moustache which perhaps few occasion where Hwang appears as a good guy. The action sequence was choreographed by Chin Yuet-sang, Corey Yuen and Mang Hoi.

Plot
Wong Chin (Hwang Jang-lee) arrives in a small town for the work, along with his sister and stepbrother. Immediately he encounters villains, who try to take over the rice market and recover the debt from Wong Chin's stepbrother. This leads Wong Chin to fight against them, as they boil "Uncle 33" (Eddy Ko) for ruining his business deal. Uncle 33 decides to kick Wong Chin out of the town, meanwhile, Beggar Fan suggests Wong Chin go to the Shaolin temple. In Shaolin temple, Wong Chin would cause trouble and due his lack of patience he managed to learn the Buddhist fist technique from the abbot. Later Wong Chin learns about inner strength and patience which would prepare him for the last battle. Meanwhile, Uncle 33 and his gang harassed and killed Wong Chin's sister and murdered stepbrother. Wong Chin later takes revenge on them.

Cast
 Hwang Jang-lee as Wong Chin 
 Fan Mei-sheng as Beggar Fan
 Eddy Ko as Uncle 33
 To Siu-ming as Wong Chin's Step brother
 Gwok Yin-yin as Wong Chin's sister
 Tino Wong Cheung as Shan Hao (student of Uncle 33, villain.)
 Chang Il-shik as the shaolin abbot
 Corey Yuen as robber (cameo)
 Eagle Han-ying as shaolin monk (cameo)
 Baek Hwang-ki as Uncle 33's thug (extra)
 Kim Yu-haeng as shaolin monk
 Ah Yeung Yiu-yam as Ah Chi (shaolin monk)

Reception
The film was fairly a good reception. The imdb.com  gave the film 6.5 out of 10. The website Kung Fu Kingdom quoted "This is the one to own for every classic kung fu enthusiast's collection!".

References

External links

1981 films
1981 martial arts films
1981 multilingual films
1980s Cantonese-language films
Hong Kong martial arts films
Hong Kong multilingual films
South Korean martial arts films
South Korean multilingual films
1980s Hong Kong films